Henry Ballate was born on July 30, 1966, in Aguada de Pasajeros, Cuba. He is a Cuban-American visual artist, curator and Art History Professor. He left Cuba in a flimsy raft through the treacherous waters of the Florida Straits in 1994. He currently lives and works between New York City and Miami.

Education 
Henry received his MFA in Visual Arts and his BFA in Graphic Design from Miami International University of Art and Design in 2007. Previously, he studied drawing and painting at the Accademia italiana in Florence, Italy, and graduated from the Art Instructors school in Matanzas, Cuba.

Art 
In his work, Henry merges art history with the contemporary style by using popular symbols, visuals, and techniques of his own making. He deals with provocative themes in his art, mixing them with popular culture in order to create a significant message. His work is easily recognizable through his use of known iconography, which are essential to his public interventions and appropriations. Throughout his career, he has exhibited at solo and group shows in America, Europe, and Asia. His works are part of private collections in the United States, Canada, Germany, Spain, France, and Italy.

Selected exhibitions 
2019 – The Repeating Island: Contemporary Art of the Caribbean, Kendall Art Center, Miami, Florida, USA 
2019 – Crosscurrents: Contemporary Selections from the Rodríguez Collection of Cuban Artists, Foosaner Art Museum, Melbourne, FL. US Cuban-artists-tell-powerful-story-in-foosaner
2018 – Tech Effect, Cornell Art Museum, Delray Beach, FL. USA
2018 – Against Gravity. Doral Contemporary Art Museum (DORCAM). Doral, USA.
2018 – MUD Foundation Gallery, Miami, FL. USA
2017 – Kendall Art Center, Miami, FL. USA
2016 – Walker Art Center, Minneapolis, USA
2015 – Vargas Gallery, Pembroke Pines, USA
2014 – Art-Street Project, Valencia, Spain
2013 – London Art Biennale, Chelsea, London, UK 
2013 – Art-Street Project During Art Basel Week, Miami, USA
2012 – Vargas Gallery, Pembroke Pines, USA
2011 – MIU Gallery, Miami, USA
2011 – SOHO ARTS, Miami, USA
2010 – Art Basel Miami, Miami, USA
2010 – Arteamericas, Miami, USA
2009 – National Art Gallery, Dhaka, Bangladesh 
2009 – Galeria Nacional, San Jose, Costa Rica 
2008 – Art Basel Miami, Miami, USA
2008 – State Art Collection, Tallahassee, USA
2007 – FYR Arte Contemporanea, Florence, Italy
2006 – Art Basel Miami, Miami, USA
2005 – Art Basel Miami, Miami, USA
2004 – Art Miami, Miami, USA
2004 – Latin American Art Museum, Miami, USA
2003 – Art Basel Miami, Miami, USA
2003 – Latin American Art Museum, Miami, USA
2002 – Art Basel Miami, Miami, USA
2001 – Florence Biennale, Dialogue Among Civilizations, Florence, Italy
2001 – Sirius Studio Art Gallery, Miami, USA
1992 – Galería Provincial de Arte, Cienfuegos, Cuba
1992 – Casa de Joven Creador, Cienfuegos, Cuba
1991 – Centro Provincial de Artes Plásticas, Habana, Cuba
1990 – Galería de Arte Varadero, Matanzas, Cuba
1990 – Galería de Matanzas, Matanzas, Cuba
1989 – Galería Aguada, Aguada de Pasajeros, Cienfuegos, Cuba

Curated exhibitions 
2019 – Retratos en chino: Aldo Menéndez Retrospective (1999–2019) Kendall Art Center. 
2019 – Ciro Quintana: Land-Scape of the Cuban Art, Kendall Art Center. 
2018 – Four artists One Generation, Kendall Art Center.
2018 – Unofficial, Kendall Art Center 
2017 – Across Time: Cuban Artists from vanguardist to contemporaries, Kendall Art Center 
2017 – Artists in Purgatory, Kendall Art Center.
2017 – Cuban Slugger by Reynerio Tamayo, Kendall Art Center 
2016 – Diálogos Místicos by José Bedia, Kendall Art Center.
2016 – International Group Exhibition, 21 New Abstract. Vargas Gallery
2015 – Explor-Art Puerto Rico, Group Exhibition. Vargas Gallery

Bibliography 
Ballate, Henry. "Re-Appropriation of Fine Arts Through Technology" Art Sôlido, 2021. 
Ballate, Henry. "D FINE Artists and Exhibitions" Rodríguez Collection, 2021. 
Ballate, Henry. "Gina Pellón Dressed of waters" Rodríguez Collection, 2020. 
Ballate, Henry. "Luna Over Miami" Poesía, Art Sôlido, 2020. 
Ballate, Henry. "Error de Imprenta" Poesía, Art Sôlido, 2019.

References 

Aguado, Enrique. "Artista secuestra la Bienal de La Habana.", April 16, 2015.
Condis, Alejandro. "La generación del milenio, nueva polémica sobre arte cubano.", January 27, 2017.
Del Risco, Enrique. "Resiliencia, La Otra Cuba: el arte como exilio.", November 15, 2015.
Bermejo, Roxana. "Made in Cuba: Utopias and some others honors.", March 1, 2018.
Official Website

Cuban contemporary artists
Living people
1966 births